Ohio's 3rd congressional district is located entirely in Franklin County and includes most of the city of Columbus. The current district lines were drawn in 2022, following the redistricting based on the 2020 census. It is currently represented by Democrat Joyce Beatty.

It was one of several districts challenged in a 2018 lawsuit seeking to overturn Ohio's congressional map due to alleged unconstitutional gerrymandering.  According to the lawsuit, the 3rd was "shaped like a snowflake" that was designed to "fracture" Columbus. The plaintiffs focused on the 3rd in part because the district is barely contiguous. In some portions, it is almost, but not quite, split in two by the neighboring 12th and 15th districts which split the rest of Columbus between them.

The 2013-2023 map, drawn in private by Republican lawmakers in a Columbus hotel room, drew most of the heavily Democratic portions of Columbus into the 3rd, with much of the rest of Columbus split into the more Republican 12th and 15th districts. An alternative plan was to split Columbus between four districts, creating 13 safe Republican seats. In May 2019, the U.S. District Court in Cincinnati deemed the map unconstitutional, as intentionally drawn to keep Republicans in power and disenfranchise Democratic voters. The U.S. Supreme Court discarded the district court ruling in October 2019.

In 2018, Ohio voters approved a ballot measure known as Issue 1, which grants the minority party oversight on redistricting, requiring 50 percent minority party approval for district maps. The process will only take place after the 2020 census and presidential election.

For most of the time from 1887 to 2003, the 3rd was a Dayton-based district; much of that territory is now the 10th district.

Election results from presidential races

List of members representing the district

Recent election results
The following chart shows historic election results. Bold type indicates victor. Italic type indicates incumbent.

1951 special election
*In 1951, after Breen's resignation for ill health, Schenck was elected in a special election to complete Breen's term.

2002
In 2002, when then-U.S. Rep. Tony P. Hall decided to accept an appointment as a U.N. ambassador, Richard Alan Carne took his place as the Democratic nominee for the congressional seat. Carne lost the race to former Dayton mayor Michael R. Turner.

2006 election

On August 13, 2006, Democratic candidate Stephanie Studebaker— who was the party's nominee to run against the incumbent Republican— was arrested, alongside her husband, on charges of domestic violence.  Two days later, she withdrew from the race, leaving the Ohio Democratic Party without a candidate in the district. A Special primary election to select a new Democratic candidate was held on 15 September 2006. Richard Chema won that election with nearly 75% of the vote, but lost to Republican Michael R. Turner in the general election.

2010

2012

2014

2016

2018

2020

2022

Historical district boundaries

See also
Ohio's congressional districts
List of United States congressional districts

Notes

References
 
 
 Congressional Biographical Directory of the United States 1774–present

03
Constituencies established in 1813
1813 establishments in Ohio